Allopurinol hypersensitivity syndrome typically occurs in persons with preexisting kidney failure.  Weeks to months after allopurinol is begun, the patient develops a morbilliform eruption or, less commonly, develops one of the far more serious and potentially lethal severe cutaneous adverse reactions viz., the DRESS syndrome, Stevens Johnson syndrome, or toxic epidermal necrolysis.

See also 
 Severe cutaneous adverse reactions (i.e. SCARs)
 Skin lesion
 List of cutaneous conditions

References

External links 

 

Drug eruptions
Syndromes